Kamta may be:

People
Kamta Prasad, Indian politician
Kamta Prasad (economist), Indian economist, author and professor
Kamta Prasad Guru, Indian linguist
Kamta Prasad Khatik, Indian politician
Kamta Singh, Indian politician

Others
Kamta or Kamtapuri, another name for the Rangpuri language, Indo-Aryan language spoken in northeastern India
Kamtapur, autonomous administrative division in Assam, India
Kamatapur Autonomous Council, autonomous administrative region in Assam, India
Kamata Kingdom, medieval kingdom in Assam and nearby areas
Kamta-Rajaula State, former princely state in central India

See also
Kamata (disambiguation)